The West Virginia Tech Golden Bears football program was a college football team that represented West Virginia University Institute of Technology in the Mid-South Conference, a part of the National Association of Intercollegiate Athletics.  The team had 25 head coaches since its first recorded football game in 1907. The final coach was Scott Tinsley who first took the position for the 2008 season. The Golden Bears' program was discontinued following the 2011 season.

Key

Coaches

Notes

References

West Virginia Tech Golden Bears

West Virginia Tech Golden Bears football coaches